The former Reno Main Post Office, located at 50 S. Virginia St. in Reno, Nevada, was built in 1933. The post office was designed by noted Nevada architect Frederic J. DeLongchamps and was built by the MacDonald Engineering Co., of Chicago, at cost of $363,660.  This building was listed on the National Register of Historic Places in 1990. as U.S. Post Office-Reno Main.

This building was deemed "an outstanding example of a combined post office and federal office building for a
medium-sized city."  And, according to its 1990 NRHP nomination this is the sole post office built by the U.S. government in Nevada that has Art Deco/Moderne styling, but it is overall "Starved Classical" in style. In 2007, this Reno Post Office building was repurposed as a business office building, named 'West Elm'. The main Reno Post Office is now located on Vassar Street.

References

External links

Buildings and structures in Reno, Nevada
History of Reno, Nevada
Government buildings completed in 1933
Post office buildings on the National Register of Historic Places in Nevada
National Register of Historic Places in Reno, Nevada
Frederic Joseph DeLongchamps buildings
Art Deco architecture in Nevada